John Helmer (born 1946) is an Australian-born journalist and foreign correspondent based in Moscow, Russia since 1989.

Biography
Born and raised in Australia, Helmer graduated in political science from Harvard University in the United States. He published several books on military and political topics, including essays on the American presidency and on urban policy in the US and essays on Greek, Mediterranean and Middle Eastern politics and foreign policy. Since 1989 he has published almost exclusively on Russian topics. He was married to Australian journalist and foreign correspondent  Claudia Wright who died in 2005.

He was allegedly recruited by the KGB in the 1980s (according to the claims of Yuri Shvets) and left to live in Russia permanently. However, Victor Cherkashin claims that Helmer was unaware that Shvets was a KGB officer, and that Cherkashin himself called Shvets off. Later, after Shvets' concerns attracted controversy, Cherkashin confirmed that Helmer was not an agent.

Helmer has been based in Moscow since 1989 and, from there, has worked for Australian Financial Review, The Australian and other newspapers.

Writing in the New Jersey Star Ledger, journalist Dave D'Alessandro described Helmer as, "the journalist residing in Moscow who has been a pebble in Mikhail Prokhorov’s shoe since oligarchs have been collecting their billions under the protection of a corrupt, Fascist state.... the kind of journalist who turns up dead once a month or so inside Putin's Russia." And also as, "a fascinating and talented fellow, if not a fair bit over the top in his pursuit of truths."

Selected works

Articles
 "Support for Ukraine's Pro-war Parties Keeps Plunging." Kyiv Post (Sep. 19, 2014).

References

Further reading
 D'Alessandro, Dave (Jan. 10, 2010). "Weekend Reading Assignment: A Russian Tale." NJ.com.
 Taibbi, Matt (Jan. 12, 2010). "The Near Assassination of John Helmer?" Rolling Stone. Archived from the original.

External links
 Dances With Bears. johnhelmer.net
 Articles by John Helmer at Kyiv Post

1946 births
Living people
American people of Australian descent
American male journalists
Harvard University alumni